Kenneth Soutar (11 October 1888 – 2 September 1914) was an English cricketer. He played for Gloucestershire in 1908.

References

1888 births
1914 deaths
English cricketers
Gloucestershire cricketers
Cricketers from Gloucester